Scharloo is a neighbourhood and former suburb of Willemstad, Curaçao. Scharloo started as a plantation, but became a wealthy neighbourhood of Willemstad. Scharloo has been designated a UNESCO World Heritage Site.

History
Scharloo started in 1634 as a plantation of the Dutch West Indies Company. The ground turned out to be infertile, and the plantation was soon abandoned. In 1694, the first wharf was built on Scharloo. In 1753, some houses had been built in Scharloo, however the government considered the area important for defence and did not allow new construction. 

From 1850 onwards, Scharloo started to develop. In 1861, the city walls were demolished, and a bridge was built in 1881 connecting Scharloo with Pietermaai. 

From 1870 onwards, wealthy Jewish merchants started to built villas in Scharloo. The hurricane of 1877 which destroyed a large part of Pietermaai, accelerated the growth of the neighbourhood. and Scharloo quickly became the wealthiest part of the city.

During the 1960s, Scharloo started to decline with many of its inhabitants moving to the suburbs. In 1999, Scharloo was designated a Unesco World Heritage Site and part of the historic centre of Willemstad. The neighbourhood was renovated in the early 21st century, and many of the villas are now in use as offices or governmental agencies.

Scharlooweg

Scharlooweg is the main street of the neighbourhood, and has the largest and most luxurious villas of Scharloo. The buildings have been constructed in Spanish style around a patio with often a fountain in the middle.

Bolo di Batrei (Wedding Cake) on Scharlooweg 77 is the most famous building of the street. Elias Salomon Levy Maduro was the son of the founder of S.E.L. Maduro. When Deborah Rebecca, his 18-year old daughter, got married, the original building was torn down and replaced by a new building with elaborate painted ceilings. On 6 June 1917, the day of the wedding, Bolo di Batrei was given to the newly weds as a present. Nowadays, the building is home to the National Archive of Curaçao.

References

Bibliography
 

Populated places in Curaçao
Willemstad